Stygnocoris sabulosus is a species of dirt-colored seed bug in the family Rhyparochromidae. It is found in Africa, Europe and Northern Asia (excluding China), and North America.

References

External links

 

Rhyparochromidae
Articles created by Qbugbot
Insects described in 1829